Samuel Mayall (June 21, 1816 – September 17, 1892) was a United States representative from Maine. He was born in North Gray, Massachusetts (now in Maine). He both attended the public schools and was tutored privately at home. Later, he moved to Gray, Maine.

Mayall was a member of the Maine House of Representatives in 1845, 1847, and 1848. He served in the Maine Senate in 1847 and 1848 but declined the Democratic nomination as a candidate for Representative to the Thirty-second Congress. He was elected as a Democrat to the Thirty-third Congress (March 4, 1853 – March 3, 1855) but was not a candidate for renomination in 1854. After leaving Congress, he was a delegate to the Republican National Convention in 1856.

Mayall moved to St. Paul, Minnesota in 1857. He became a large landowner before he was commissioned as a captain at the beginning of the American Civil War. After the war, he devoted his time to looking after his large business interests. He died in St. Paul, Minnesota in 1892 and was buried in Oakland Cemetery.

References

1816 births
1892 deaths
People from Gray, Maine
Democratic Party members of the Maine House of Representatives
Democratic Party Maine state senators
Democratic Party members of the United States House of Representatives from Maine
19th-century American politicians